Peter Lawler (born 25 April 1941) is a British sprint canoer who competed from the mid-1960s to the early 1970s. He was eliminated in the semifinals of the K-4 1000 m event at the 1964 Summer Olympics in Tokyo. Four years later in Mexico City, Lawler was eliminated in the semifinals of the K-2 1000 m event. At his last Summer Olympics in Munich, he was eliminated in the repechage round of the K-4 1000 m event.

References

Sports-reference.com profile

1941 births
Canoeists at the 1964 Summer Olympics
Canoeists at the 1968 Summer Olympics
Canoeists at the 1972 Summer Olympics
Living people
Olympic canoeists of Great Britain
British male canoeists